Paul Sehzue (born 10 May 1978) is a Liberian hurdler. He competed in the men's 110 metres hurdles at the 2000 Summer Olympics.

References

1978 births
Living people
Athletes (track and field) at the 2000 Summer Olympics
Liberian male hurdlers
Olympic athletes of Liberia
Place of birth missing (living people)